Nanki Ram Kanwar is an Indian politician and former Home Minister of Government of Chhattisgarh. He is a member of Bharatiya Janta Party and was also Cabinet Minister in Sunder Lal Patwa ministry in Government of Madhya Pradesh.

He is well noted for his support of aggressive stance against the Naxalites. In 2006 he was noted for supporting the Salwa Judum. By 2010 he was known to have looked at alternate methods for fighting terrorism. He is also known for taking a strong stance against improper investigative techniques of the Chhattisgarh police. He was also in controversy for suggesting that Swami Agnivesh was supporting Maoists.

Political career 
Kanwar first unsuccessfully contested 1972 MP Assembly election from Rampur constituency as a candidate of Bharatiya Jana Sangh. He won 1977 Assembly election and became Parliamentary Secretary (Finance) and later Minister of state (Finance) in Janata Party Government of Madhya Pradesh. He won 1990 Assembly election and became Cabinet Minister in Sunder Lal Patwa ministry. Again, he lost 1993 Assembly election but won 1998, 2003 and 2008 consecutively. He became Cabinet Minister for Law, Agriculture, Animal Husbandry and various departments in 2003 and Home Minister in 2008 in Raman Singh's ministry.

References

External links 
 vidhansabha
 nankiram

Living people
State cabinet ministers of Chhattisgarh
Bharatiya Janata Party politicians from Chhattisgarh
State cabinet ministers of Madhya Pradesh
1943 births
Chhattisgarh MLAs 2018–2023
Madhya Pradesh MLAs 1977–1980
Madhya Pradesh MLAs 1990–1992
Madhya Pradesh MLAs 1998–2003
Chhattisgarh MLAs 2000–2003
Chhattisgarh MLAs 2003–2008
Chhattisgarh MLAs 2008–2013